The  Orlando Predators season was the 21st season for the franchise in the Arena Football League. The team was coached by Bret Munsey and played their home games at Amway Center. Finishing with a 4–14 record, the Predators missed the playoffs for the first time since their inaugural season in 1991, snapping a streak of 19 consecutive playoff appearances.

Standings

Schedule
The Predators began the season at home against the Pittsburgh Power on March 9. They hosted the Milwaukee Mustangs in their final regular season game on July 22.

 Gray indicates that the game was played with replacement players because of the players' strike.

Final roster

References

Orlando Predators
Orlando Predators seasons
2012 in sports in Florida
2010s in Orlando, Florida